Eva Herzog (born 25 December 1962) is a Swiss politician who has represented Basel-Stadt in the Council of States since 2019. She is a member of the Social Democratic Party (SP/PS).

Education 
Between 1981 and 1988 she studied History, Economics and Spanish at the University in Basel and University of Santiago de Compostela and graduated with a MSc in 1988.

Professional career 
Between 1995 and 2000 she held a leading position in the management of the Artspace  in Basel. From 2001 until 2004 she was employed as a scientific collaborator at the University of Basel.

Political career 
She was elected in to the Grand Council of Basel-Stadt in 2001 and in 2003 she assumed the presidency of the SP group in the Grand Council. She remained a member of the Grand Council until 2005, when she assumed as a member of the Executive Council of Basel-Stadt and onwards headed the finance department.

In May 2019, she announced that she would resign as a State Council of Basel in January 2020. In October 2019 she was elected to the Council of States. As she was a candidate for both the Council of State and the National Council, Mustafa Atici assumed her post in the National Council.

In 2010 she was a candidate for the Federal Council as a successor for the resigning Moritz Leuenberger. But in the elections Simonetta Sommaruga was elected. After in November 2022 Simmonetta Sommaruga announced her resignation, she and Elisabeth Baume-Schneider became the candidate for Sommarug's succession. On the 7 December Baume-Schneider was elected to the Federal Council and a week later Eva Herzog to the Vice-Presidency to the Council of States.

References 

Swiss politicians
Members of the National Council (Switzerland)
1962 births
Social Democratic Party of Switzerland politicians
Living people
University of Basel alumni
University of Santiago de Compostela alumni
People from Basel-Landschaft